Say I Love You. is a 2012 romance Japanese anime based on the manga written and illustrated by Kanae Hazuki. Mei Tachibana is a socially awkward teenager who not only believes that friendships end in betrayal, but has also never had a boyfriend in all of her 16 years of existence. One day she has a fateful encounter with the most popular boy at her high school, Yamato Kurosawa San, when she kicks him straight in the palm of his hand and  bruises him. Despite this, an intrigued Yamato embarks on a campaign to get to know Mei better. The story follows Mei and the new experiences she undertakes as she slowly allows Yamato to get closer to her, including becoming his girlfriend and making new friends along the way with Yamato's help.

The anime is produced by Zexcs and directed by Toshimasa Kuroyanagi, with series composition by Takuya Satō, character designs by Yoshiko Okuda, art direction by Yuka Hirama, and soundtrack music by Yuuji Nomi. The series premiered on October 6, 2012, on Tokyo MX, with later airings on Chiba TV, tvk, Sun TV, KBA, TV Aichi, TVh, AT-X, and BS11. The thirteen-episode series was followed by an OAD episode on July 24, 2013. The series was picked up by Crunchyroll for online simulcast streaming in North America and other select parts of the world. The Anime Network later obtained the series for streaming in an English dub. StarChild released the series in Japan on six Blu-ray and DVD volumes between December 26, 2012, and May 22, 2013. The anime was licensed by Sentai Filmworks for distribution via select digital outlets and a home media release in North America. The series was also acquired by Hanabee Entertainment for release in Australia.

The ending theme is "Slow Dance" by Suneohair.  by Suneohair is used as the insert song of episode 12.



Episode list

Specials
The following special episodes are included on the Blu-ray and DVD volumes of the series. The episodes are titled "Mei and Meowrsmellow" with a few including content-specific titles.

Home media
StarChild released the series in Japan on six Blu-ray and DVD volumes between December 26, 2012, and May 22, 2013. The complete series was released on Blu-ray and DVD volumes by Sentai Filmworks on December 24, 2013. Hanabee Entertainment released the series on February 5, 2014, on DVD format only. These releases contained English and Japanese audio options and English subtitles.

Notes

References

External links
Official anime website 

Say I Love You